Joseph Polletta (born September 1, 1988) is an American politician serving as a member of the Connecticut House of Representatives from the 68th district. He assumed office on May 1, 2017.

Early life and education 
Polletta was born in Waterbury and raised in Oakville, Connecticut. He earned a Bachelor of Arts degree in political science from Fairfield University.

Career 
Outside of politics, Polletta works as a real estate agent. Starting in 2011, he served as a member and vice chair of the Watertown Town Council. In 2015, he served as a community liaison for Congresswoman Elizabeth Esty. He was elected to the Connecticut House of Representatives in and 2017 special election. During the 2019–2020 legislative session, he served as ranking member of the House Labor and Public Employees Committee. Since 2021, he has served as ranking member of the Housing Committee.

References 

Living people
1988 births
People from Waterbury, Connecticut
Fairfield University alumni
Republican Party members of the Connecticut House of Representatives
People from Watertown, Connecticut